Events in the year 1959 in China. The country had an estimated population of 665 million people.

Incumbents
 Chairman of the Chinese Communist Party: Mao Zedong
 President of the People's Republic of China: Mao Zedong (until April 27), Liu Shaoqi (starting April 27)
 Premier of the People's Republic of China: Zhou Enlai
 Chairman of the National People's Congress: Liu Shaoqi (until April 27), Zhu De (starting April 27)
 Vice President of the People's Republic of China: Zhu De (until April 27), Song Qingling & Dong Biwu (starting April 27)
 Vice Premier of the People's Republic of China: Chen Yun

Governors  
 Governor of Anhui Province: Huang Yan
 Governor of Fujian Province: Ye Fei then Jiang Yizhen 
 Governor of Gansu Province: Deng Baoshan
 Governor of Guangdong Province: Chen Yu 
 Governor of Guizhou Province: Zhou Lin
 Governor of Hebei Province: Liu Zihou 
 Governor of Heilongjiang Province: Li Fanwu
 Governor of Henan Province: Wu Zhipu 
 Governor of Hubei Province: Zhang Tixue 
 Governor of Hunan Province: Cheng Qian 
 Governor of Jiangsu Province: Hui Yuyu 
 Governor of Jiangxi Province: Shao Shiping 
 Governor of Jilin Province: Li Youwen 
 Governor of Liaoning Province: Huang Oudong 
 Governor of Qinghai Province: Yuan Renyuan
 Governor of Shaanxi Province: Zhao Shoushan (until July), Zhao Boping (starting July)
 Governor of Shandong Province: Tan Qilong 
 Governor of Shanxi Province: Wei Heng 
 Governor of Sichuan Province: Li Dazhang
 Governor of Yunnan Province: Ding Yichuan
 Governor of Zhejiang Province: Zhou Jianren

Events
 Continuing Great Leap Forward
 Continuing Great Chinese Famine
 April - First plenary session of the 2nd National People's Congress, Liu Shaoqi was elected the President of China. 
 March 10 - Start of the 1959 Tibetan uprising
 July 2 - Start of the Lushan Conference
 October 1 - 10th anniversary of the People's Republic of China

Other events
 October 1 - Opening of Changfeng Park, in Putuo District, Shanghai
 Opening of People's Park, in Xining, Qinghai 
 Establishment of Chaohu Prison, in Chaohu, Anhui
 Establishment of the Fourth Affiliated Hospital of XMU, in Urumqi, Xinjiang
 Establishment of the National Ballet of China Symphony Orchestra
 Establishment of the State Bureau of Surveying and Mapping

Education

Establishments
 Anhui University of Chinese Medicine, in Hefei, Anhui
 Anhui University of Finance and Economics, in Bengbu, Anhui
 Beijing Institute of Textile Technology
 Yunnan Arts University, in Kunming, Yunnan

Births 

 Li Qiang
 Zhu Xingliang
 Deng Kai
 Dai Jinhua
 Ma Zhengqi

Deaths 

 Wong Shik Ling
 Lei Jingtian
 Zhang Xi
 Li Daichen
 Li Jishen

See also
 1959 in Chinese film

References

 
1950s in China
Years of the 20th century in China